Zvi Sherf (born December 18, 1951 in Tel Aviv, Israel), known almost universally by his nickname Zvika, is an Israeli former basketball player and professional basketball coach.

Coaching career
Sherf played basketball with the Maccabi Tel Aviv youth teams, starting at age 12. By age 16, Sherf was playing for Maccabi South Tel Aviv (the club's second side), and was sent to a coaching course, along with fellow future Israeli basketball coach Pini Gershon. By age 20, Sherf was coaching the Maccabi Tel Aviv youth teams, and by age 25, he was coaching Maccabi South Tel Aviv, leading it to his first championship.

In the 1980–81 season, when Maccabi Tel Aviv won the EuroLeague, the Israeli League and the Israeli State Cup titles, Sherf was an assistant coach to Rudy D'Amico. Sherf became Maccabi Tel Aviv's head coach in the 1983–84 season, and stayed in that role through the 1985–86 season. In 1984, (at the age of 33), he became the senior men's Israeli national basketball team head coach.

His first Israeli national team coaching tenure (which lasted three years), saw two EuroBasket appearances (1985, 1987) and Israel's historic 7th place finish at the 1986 FIBA World Basketball Championship. Sherf's tenure as national team head coach ended after what was perceived as a poor performance at EuroBasket 1987 (11th position), but Sherf later returned as the team's head coach for the years 1991-97. In 2005, Sherf was again appointed head coach of the Israeli national basketball team, and on January 1, 2008, he was appointed head coach of Maccabi Tel Aviv.

Sherf's coaching career includes a Saporta Cup title with Aris Thessaloniki (1992–93), three EuroLeague Finals appearances, 10 Israeli League championships, and six Israeli State Cup titles (all with Maccabi Tel Aviv).

On April 10, 2018, Sherf returned to Maccabi Rishon LeZion for a third stint, replacing Shmulik Brener. On November 26, 2018, Sherf parted ways with Rishon LeZion.

Honors and awards

Israeli titles
 10× Israeli Super League Champion: (1983–84, 1984–85, 1985–86, 1986–87, 1988–89, 1989–90, 1990–91, 1991–92, all with Maccabi Tel Aviv);
 6× Israeli State Cup Winner: (1984–85, 1985–86, 1986–87, 1988–89, 1989–90, 1990–91, all with Maccabi Tel Aviv).

European honors and titles
 FIBA Saporta Cup Champion: (1992–93, with Aris Thessaloniki);
 3× EuroLeague Finalist: (1986–87, 1988–89, 2007–08 with Maccabi Tel Aviv);
 EuroLeague Final Four: third-place (1990–91, with Maccabi Tel Aviv).
 Russian Cup Winner: (2010–11, with Spartak St. Petersburg)

References

External links

 EuroLeague Profile
 Tzahevet Profile 
 Zvi Sherf is the new Israeli NT Coach

1951 births
Living people
Aris B.C. coaches
BC Dynamo Moscow coaches
BC Spartak Saint Petersburg coaches
Hapoel Jerusalem B.C. coaches
Israeli basketball coaches
Israeli Jews
Israeli expatriate basketball people in Russia
Israeli expatriate basketball people in Greece
Israeli expatriate basketball people in France
Israeli people of Romanian-Jewish descent
Limoges CSP coaches
Maccabi Tel Aviv B.C. coaches
Makedonikos B.C. coaches
P.A.O.K. BC coaches
Sportspeople from Tel Aviv
Israeli expatriate basketball people in Poland